Mono Brosta is the debut extended play by Greek singer Demy, released in Greece on 23 May 2012 by Panik Records. The album has peaked at number 1 on the Greek Albums Chart. She released the single as a digital download in 2011. The song also peaked at number 1 on the Greek Singles Chart.

Track listing

Charts

Weekly charts

Release history

References

2012 EPs
Greek-language albums
Demy (singer) albums